Bobby Bernard Turner Jr. (born September 8, 1988), professionally known as Bobby Kritical, is an American record producer, songwriter and audio engineer. Bobby Kritical has produced music with several prominent artists in the music industry, including K Camp, Gucci Mane, Lil Uzi Vert, and YFN Lucci, among others. He is best known for being the executive producer of K Camp's album Wayy 2 Kritical released in 2019.

Career 
Bobby Bernard Turner Jr. was born in Atlanta, Georgia. He first received local attention by co-producing "97" for K Camp in 2017. Later in 2017, he received national attention for co-producing songs "For Real" & "Diamonds All on My Wrist" on Lil Uzi Vert's Luv Is Rage 2.Bobby Kritical received national attention in 2018 for producing "Trust Me" by Bhad Bhabie.In 2019, Bobby Kritical was the executive producer for "Wayy 2 Kritical" which was the third studio album for K Camp.

Production discography

2015 
K Camp – Only Way Is Up
12. "I'm Good"
Lil Uzi Vert – Luv Is Rage
11. "Belly"
Rick Ross – Black Dollar
17. "Dead Rappers"

2016 
2 Chainz – Daniel Son; Necklace Don
08. "You In Luv with Her" featuring YFN Lucci
2 Chainz – ColleGrove
09. "100 Joints"

2017 
K Camp
00. "Good Problem"
Lil Uzi Vert – Luv Is Rage 2
06. "For Real"
19. "Diamonds All on My Wrist"

2018 
YFN Lucci – Freda's Son
02. "Front Row in LA"
03. "650 Luc"
Bhad Bhabie – 15 (mixtape)
13. "Trust Me" featuring Ty Dolla Sign
JID – DiCaprio 2
12. "Just Da Other Day"

2019 
Gucci Mane – Woptober II
10. "Wop Longway Takeoff" featuring Peewee Longway and Takeoff

2020 
K Camp – Kiss Five
10. "Black Men Don't Cheat" featuring Ari Lennox, 6lack and Tink
11. "Top 10" featuring Yella Beezy

References

Further reading 
 Hot 107.9
 Elevator Magazine

External links 

1988 births
Living people
American hip hop record producers